XXX (stylized as xXx and pronounced Triple X) is a 2002 American action film directed by Rob Cohen, produced by Neal H. Moritz and written by Rich Wilkes. The first installment in the XXX film series, the film stars Vin Diesel as Xander Cage, a thrill-seeking extreme sports enthusiast, stuntman and rebellious athlete-turned reluctant spy for the National Security Agency. Cage is sent on a dangerous mission to infiltrate a group of potential Russian terrorists in Central Europe. The film also stars Asia Argento, Marton Csokas and Samuel L. Jackson. Cohen, Moritz and Diesel had previously worked on The Fast and the Furious (2001) as director, producer and cast member respectively.

The film grossed $277.4 million worldwide and was followed by two sequels, XXX: State of the Union and XXX: Return of Xander Cage, released in 2005 and 2017, respectively.

Plot
 
Anarchy 99, a Russian terrorist group, acquires a biochemical weapon, "Silent Night", presumed missing since the fall of the Soviet Union. Undercover National Security Agency agent Jim McGrath is assigned to recover the weapon, but is discovered and killed by Anarchy 99. NSA Agent Augustus Gibbons suggests sending someone who lacks ties to the US government, such as Xander "XXX" Cage, an extreme sports professional wanted by the FBI for acts protesting against a senator. Gibbons takes Cage into custody, who then passes two field tests, before reluctantly accepting the job after he is told the only other option is prison.

Cage meets the NSA support team in Prague, which includes Czech agent Milan Sova, who has been tasked with supervising and, if necessary, deporting Cage. While scouting an Anarchy 99 party, Cage identifies Sova as a police officer to Anarchy 99's leader, Yorgi, earning him favor with the group. Cage asks Yorgi about purchasing high end sports cars, and Yelena, Yorgi's girlfriend and lieutenant, gives Cage an account number.

Gibbons calls Cage about changes to the plan but is impressed when Cage gives them information provided by the star-struck Kolya. As a result, Gibbons sends tech-specialist Agent Toby Shavers, who provides Cage with a special revolver, binoculars that can see through walls and explosives disguised as bandages. As Cage attends the car deal he made with Yorgi, Sova attempts to intercede. Using the trick revolver and special effects, Cage fakes killing Sova. Having earned Yorgi's trust, Cage joins Anarchy 99.

Yorgi brings Cage back to a castle after a dance party at one of his nightclubs that serves as Anarchy 99's headquarters. Cage, while searching for the biochemical weapon, catches Yelena investigating Yorgi's secret safe. He takes her to a nearby restaurant to discuss the matter and reveals his true identity. Sova betrays Cage to Yorgi on the phone. Furious, Yorgi sends his trusted sniper Kirill to kill Cage. While watching the pair, Kirill, who is in love with Yelena, warns her. As Cage and Yelena stage a fight, the NSA suddenly appears to capture Cage, and Yelena is taken back to Anarchy 99.

Cage meets with Gibbons, who demands that Cage return to America now that his cover is blown and special forces are planning to siege the castle. Cage refuses, fearing for Yelena's life and bitter that Sova purposely blew his cover. Cage sneaks into Yorgi's castle and follows him into a secret underground lab. Cage overhears Yorgi's plan to launch "Silent Night" from a water-borne drone named Ahab. Cage flees the area after killing Kolya. At his hideout, he finds Sova waiting for him, now with Yorgi. Before Sova can kill Cage, Yelena saves him and reveals herself to be an undercover Russian Federal Security Service agent abandoned by her handlers. Cage relays Yorgi's plans to the NSA in return for Yelena's asylum. Against orders, Cage gives his car to Shavers and tells him to load it up with weaponry. Cage parachutes from a plane on a snowboard near Anarchy 99's communication tower. He starts an avalanche that destroys the tower but is captured by Yorgi, who already knew Yelena's identity. As Yorgi prepares to kill them, the special forces attack. Cage and Yelena free their restraints, but Yorgi launches Ahab before Cage kills him.

The Czech military prepares to destroy Ahab with airstrikes, though this will release some of the biochemical agent. Cage and Yelena take his car, now heavily modified by Agent Shavers, to race alongside the river to catch up to Ahab. Cage harpoons the drone, crosses over to it, and disables the weapon moments before it goes off. Cage and Yelena are recovered, and Gibbons follows through on his promises. In the conclusion, Cage and Yelena are relaxing in Bora Bora when Gibbons contacts Cage to offer him another mission, but Cage ignores him.

Cast
 Vin Diesel as Agent Xander "Triple X" Cage, a thrill seeking American extreme sports enthusiast, stuntman and anti-establishment activist. Idolized in some sub-cultures, xXx is also hunted by the authorities and he is offered a deal to become a spy for the National Security Agency in exchange for leniency, the agency requiring an agent who can do the current job without the military professional training that Anarchy 99's background will allow them to recognise.
 Samuel L. Jackson as Agent Augustus Gibbons, a high-ranking official in the National Security Agency who has the power to give xXx a pardon for his crimes. He uses this fact as leverage to recruit xXx for a mission he knows xXx is the only person with the possibility of succeeding- infiltrating Anarchy 99-, recognising the benefits of xXx's rebellious attitude and unorthodox methods.
 William Hope as Agent Roger Donnan, the Associate and Administrator of the National Security Agency.
 Danny Trejo as "El Jefe", a torturer for a Colombian drug cartel.
 Asia Argento as Agent Yelena, Yorgi's apparent girlfriend. Originally a Russian intelligence agent, sent to watch over Yorgi but has since been abandoned by her superiors. Yelena becomes romantically involved with xXx and he attempts to get her political asylum in the United States for her assistance in bringing down Yorgi.
 Marton Csokas as Yorgi, Former soldier in the army of the Soviet Union, now a wealthy hedonist owning a string of locations around Eastern Europe, including a castle and nightclubs. Yorgi is also the leader of Anarchy 99, a group of militant anarchists with a disdain for all forms of government and authority, and society in general. His ultimate aim is complete lawlessness across the world.
 Michael Roof as Agent Toby Lee Shavers: NSA techno-genius and gadget specialist.
 Richy Müller as Milan Sova, a cop and double agent.
 Werner Daehn as Kirill, a member of Anarchy 99, cigarette addict and rifle sharpshooter.
 Petr Jákl as Kolya, Yorgi's younger brother.
 Jan Pavel Filipensky as Viktor, a member of Anarchy 99 and close friend of Yorgi. He is usually with Yorgi wherever he goes.
 Tom Everett as Senator Dick Hotchkiss, a conservative California State Senator; his car is stolen and wrecked by xXx prior to his recruitment by the NSA, in an act of property destruction, as a protest against some of Hotchkiss's policies.
 Thomas Ian Griffith as Agent Jim McGrath, an undercover agent killed by Anarchy 99 while trying to retrieve the Silent Night weapon.
 Eve as J.J., Xander's friend
 Leila Arcieri as Jordan King
 Rammstein as Themselves

To imply Xander Cage's credibility within extreme sport subcultures, various personalities make cameo appearances:

 Tony Hawk makes a cameo appearance in the Corvette scene from the bottom of the bridge driving the getaway Cadillac, (near the beginning of the film) and skating over a half-pipe at Xander's place later.
 Mike Vallely also makes a cameo as a cameraman and an extra. Pro motocross rider Carey Hart is seen in the back seat of the Cadillac driven by Tony Hawk.
 Rider Matt Hoffman exchanges lines with Xander during the party scene.
 Also during the party scene, Josh Todd (the lead singer of Buckcherry) makes a cameo appearance though he never turns around, but his suicide king of hearts tattoo can be seen on his back.

Production 

In July 2001 it was announced that Vin Diesel will receive in the neighborhood of $10 million to star in the film, with an initial release date of July 26, 2002. In August 2001, Sony put a large billboard of XXX in Hollywood, before a script had been written. There was also a teaser trailer released on May 3, 2002. It was then attached to Spider-Man, and shown on the web.

Filming took place at three locations. Most of the film is set in Prague, Czech Republic. The Corvette jump was filmed at the Foresthill Bridge in Auburn State Recreation Area, Auburn, California. The final scenes were set in Bora Bora, Tahiti, and other areas in southern West Virginia.

Several Czech Su-22s were used for the film. It was one of the last "actions" of these aircraft – Czech Air Force decommissioned Sukhois in 2002.

Vin Diesel did many of his own stunts, director Rob Cohen said: "I think the thing is that Vin did more than he should have, but less than he wanted to." Diesel took a fall during the avalanche scene, and landed head first and wasn't moving, and Cohen was worried the star of the film might have broken his neck. The Corvette bridge based jump was performed by Tim Rigby wearing a Vin Diesel mask. The motorcycle jump was performed by professional motocross rider and stuntman Jeremy Stenberg, and Diesel's face was later added digitally.

Stunt player Harry O'Connor, Diesel's stunt double, was killed on April 4, 2002, when he hit a pillar of the Palacký Bridge in Prague, para-sailing during one of the action scenes. The accident occurred while filming the second take of the stunt; O'Connor's first attempt was completed without incident and can be seen in the completed film, which was dedicated to him.

The first few minutes of the film take place at a concert of German Neue Deutsche Härte band Rammstein in Prague, performing the song "Feuer Frei". The same clip is available, but from the band's perspective (with only brief scenes from the film) in their video compilation Lichtspielhaus.

Music 

The film score was composed by Randy Edelman, a frequent collaborator of Cohen's. The film also featured a contemporary rock music soundtrack. Rammstein provided some of the music and was even featured in the film in the opening scene. During the club scene in Prague, Orbital can be seen playing their exclusive track "Technologicque Park" live before the dancing crowd. The soundtrack album also features Queens of the Stone Age, Drowning Pool, Hatebreed, Nelly, Lil Wayne, N.E.R.D, Fermín IV and Moby. It was released on August 6, 2002, through Universal Records. It peaked at #9 on the Billboard 200, #16 on the Top R&B/Hip-Hop Albums and #1 on the Top Soundtracks. The "Tweaker remix" of the song "Adrenaline" by Gavin Rossdale (the lead singer of Bush) was featured was in the film, while the original version is included on the soundtrack. None of Edelman's score was included on the album, with a separate disc of his work released by Varèse Sarabande.

Reception

Box office 

The film opened in 3,374 theaters and grossed $44,506,103 in its opening weekend. It grossed a total of $142 million, and a further $135 million internationally for a worldwide total of $277.4 million worldwide

Critical response 
On Rotten Tomatoes the film has an approval rating of 48% based on reviews from 180 critics, with an average rating of 5.59/10. The site's consensus reads: "It has an endearing lack of seriousness, and Vin Diesel has more than enough muscle for the starring role, but ultimately, XXX is a missed opportunity to breathe new life into the spy thriller genre." On Metacritic the film has a score of 48 out of 100, based on reviews from 33 critics, indicating "mixed or average reviews". Audiences surveyed by CinemaScore gave the film a grade A− on scale of A to F.

Roger Ebert of the Chicago Sun-Times gave it  stars out of 4, writing, "In its own punk way, XXX is as good as a good Bond movie, and that's saying something." Peter Travers of Rolling Stone wrote: "It's hard to hate a movie, even one this droolingly crass, that knows how to laugh at itself." Adam Smith of Empire called the movie, "Sporadically entertaining, but seriously hampered by a very choppy screenplay", and rating it three out of five stars.

This film was nominated for a Razzie Award for Most Flatulent Teen-Targeted Movie, but lost to Jackass: The Movie.

References

External links

 
 
 

2002 films
2002 action thriller films
2000s spy films
American action adventure films
American action thriller films
American spy films
2000s English-language films
Films produced by Neal H. Moritz
2000s German-language films
2000s Spanish-language films
2000s Russian-language films
Czech-language films
Techno-thriller films
Films set in California
Films set in Colombia
Films set in Prague
Films shot in Austria
Films shot in Bora Bora
Films shot in California
Films shot in the Czech Republic
Films shot in Los Angeles
Films shot in West Virginia
Revolution Studios films
Columbia Pictures films
Original Film films
Films scored by Randy Edelman
Films directed by Rob Cohen
Avalanches in film
1
2000s American films
American spy action films